The Victorian Railways X class was a class of  mainline goods locomotives operated by the Victorian Railways between 1886 and 1920.

History
First class using the new Victorian Railway letter classification system.

Production
Built by the Phoenix Foundry, Ballarat in 1886/87, these were large engines of the English tradition featuring a low footplate and a continuous coupling rod splasher similar to the 'Old' A class. They had a steel cab with cutaway side sheets and a small side window which remained unaltered during their life. The tenders also were similar to the 'Old' A's in design and capacity; a six wheel type with narrow tanks to make space above the footplate for the springs. They were painted in bright green and white outlines, with polished brass dome cover and copper chimney cap.

Regular service
Although they were classed as a main line goods engine, they were regularly assigned to extra and excursion passenger traffic, even working express rosters at times, including the Adelaide Express as far as Stawell and some Gippsland trains to Warragul. They also operated race and showgrounds traffic on the Flemington Racecourse line. In 1894, 13 were allocated to North Melbourne and two to Ballarat probably for working the Adelaide Express.

Design improvements
They were fitted with cow-catches and Westinghouse air-brakes in the 1890s.

Several were used in tests with water and coal economy devices:
No. 353 was fitted with 'Alve's hot air apparatus' in 1893, which was fitted around the chimney. It had large air ducts to the ashpan to preheat the primary air supply to the firebox and thus aid combustion. This was a short-lived experiment of dubious benefit.
Nos. 355 and 357 were fitted with Knorr's feed water heaters in 1894.
No. 353 was fitted with Knorr's feed water heater and an Alve's hot water pump in August 1895.
Nos. 355 and 379 had Adam's vortex blast pipes installed during 1889 and 1891 in an attempt to improve drafting and front-end efficiency.
Reboilering in 1900-03 raised the working pressure from 140 psi to 155 psi, and the cylinders were rebored to 18 1/2 inches in diameter in 1914-17 with an increase in tractive effort to 18390 pounds. In 1916 the working pressure was reduced to 145 psi, dropping the tractive effort to 17203 pounds.

Accidents
4 November 1886 - X359 damaged in accident.
11 January 1888 - X381 damaged in accident.
4 February 1888 - X365 ran away on Sunbury Bank.
14 January 1889 - X365 damaged in accident.
8 February 1889 - X355 damaged in accident.
May 1889 - X373 damaged in accident.
18 October 1889 - X355 derailed and turned over embankment near Seymour.
24 February 1890 - X359 and X365 damaged in accident.
July 1890 - X371 damaged in accident.
9 June 1898 - X381 damaged in accident.
2 November 1907 - X369 damaged in accident.
5 October 1916 - X359 damaged in collision at Melbourne Yard.
15 August 1918 - X375 damaged in accident at Newmarket.

Withdrawal
All the locomotives were removed from the Victorian Railways register between 1917 and 1920

Fleet summary

Model Railways

References

Specific

0-6-0 locomotives
Railway locomotives introduced in 1886
Victorian Railways X class steam (1886)
Victorian Railways X class steam (1886)
X class steam (1886)
Phoenix locomotives